Cifax is an unincorporated community in Bedford County, Virginia, United States.

The Cifax Rural Historic District, which includes Cifax and the surrounding area, is listed on the National Register of Historic Places.

References

Unincorporated communities in Bedford County, Virginia